This page lists the rosters, by season, of the UCI Women's Team, Orica–AIS.

2021
Ages as of 1 January 2021.

2020
Ages as of 1 January 2020.

2019
Ages as of 1 January 2019.

2018
Ages as of 1 January 2018.

2017
Ages as of 1 January 2017.

2016

2015
Ages as of 1 January 2015.

2014

Ages as of 1 January 2014.

*On June 17, the team announced the signing of Katrin Garfoot for the remainder of the 2014 season.

2013

2012

References

Lists of cyclists by team